Final Draft is a 2007 American horror film directed by Jonathan Dueck.

Plot 
Paul (James Van Der Beek) is a script writer with a big problem: he only has 18 days to release his last script. A script that could be his chance to be someone well-knowing. He decides to lock his home and to live isolated until the job is done. But the main character of his story is a maniac clown, and something happens...the line between fantasy and reality is so thin, Paul is going crazy.

Cast
James Van Der Beek 	    ... Paul Twist	
Tara Spencer-Nairn 	    ... Kate Twist	
Melanie Marden                ...         
Darryn Lucio 	    ... 	
Jeff Roop 	    ... 	Michael
Devon Ferguson 	            ...

Release
Final Draft was released on DVD by Peace Arch Entertainment on September 18, 2007.

Critical reception 

DVD Talk gave the film a negative review, calling it "overly simplistic".

References

External links
 
 
 

2007 films
2007 horror films
American psychological horror films
Horror films about clowns
2000s English-language films
2000s American films